The Lincoln Bible is a Bible that was owned by William Thomas Carroll, a clerk of the U.S. Supreme Court. The bible was used by President Abraham Lincoln at his inauguration in 1861. It was also used by President Barack Obama at his inaugurations in 2009 and 2013. Finally, it was most recently used by President Donald Trump at his inauguration in 2017. The bible was returned to Caroll after Lincoln's first inauguration. He later gave it to the Lincoln family sometime after Lincoln's assassination. Mary Harlan Lincoln would later donate the Bible to the Library of Congress in 1928.

Overview
The Bible is an Oxford University Press edition of the King James Bible. The back flyleaf of the Bible bears the seal of the Supreme Court of the United States along with a record of the 1861 inauguration. The Bible is not a rare edition, and a similar Bible lacking the Lincoln Bible's historical significance would be valued at approximately $30 or $40.

History

Abraham Lincoln reached Washington, D.C. for his inauguration in 1861. His belongings, including his Bible, had yet to arrive. William Thomas Carroll, the clerk of the U.S. Supreme Court, fetched a Bible that he kept for official use. This became the Lincoln Bible. Although the Bible remained with Carroll for a time, the Lincolns acquired it at an unknown time. The Bible later remained with the Lincoln family up until 1928, at which point Mary Eunice Harlan, the widow of Robert Todd Lincoln, donated it to the Library of Congress. When the Bible was donated, it contained markers at the 31st chapter of the Book of Deuteronomy and the fourth chapter of the Book of Hosea.

Barack Obama chose to use this Bible for his inaugurations in 2009 and 2013. The Bible was on display at the Library of Congress from February to May 2009 in a celebration of the bicentennial of Lincoln's birth. The Bible was used to swear in Carla Hayden as the 14th Librarian of Congress on September 14, 2016. Donald Trump was sworn in on this Bible and his childhood Bible at his inauguration on January 20, 2017.

See also
 United States presidential inauguration
 George Washington Inaugural Bible
 Religious views of Abraham Lincoln

References

External links

Digital image showing inscription documenting use as Abraham Lincoln's inaugural Bible From the Collections at the Library of Congress
The Lincoln Bible; digitized and available for download or online viewing from the World Digital Library

Inauguration of Donald Trump
Individual Bibles
First inauguration of Barack Obama
Presidency of Abraham Lincoln
Second inauguration of Barack Obama
United States presidential inaugurations